Euptera nigeriensis, the Nigerian euptera, is a butterfly in the family Nymphalidae. It is found in Nigeria. The habitat consists of forests.

References

Endemic fauna of Nigeria
Butterflies described in 1998
Euptera